The Levels may refer to:

 One of several areas of flat, low-lying land in England:
 The Somerset Levels
 The North Somerset Levels or Avon Levels
 The Minsmere Levels
 A former name for the suburb of Mawson Lakes, South Australia